Thur may refer to:

Thur (France), a river in Alsace, France
Thur (Rhine), a river in East Switzerland
Thursday, as an abbreviation
Thur., taxonomic author abbreviation for French botanist Gustave Thuret (1817–1875)